Haifa Wehbe is a Lebanese-Egyptian singer and actress. She is considered one of Lebanon's most famous and successful singers, and one of the best-known artists in the Arab world.

She has been among the highest-selling and most successful female Middle Eastern woman in the world, She was ranked 8th on the list of the 99 most “desirable women” according to Askmen.com. During her career, she won many awards in the category of actresses, singers and performers. She has released seven studio albums, and made her acting debut in the 2008 Pepsi-produced film Sea of Stars. In 2006, Wehbe was on People Magazine's 50 most beautiful people list. Wehbe is also the 2nd richest celebrity in the Arab world, with a reported estimated wealth of over $57 million.

In 1991, at the age of eighteen, she was chosen as Miss South Lebanon, and the holder of the title of Miss Lebanon for the year 1992, but the title was withdrawn from her because of her violation of the laws of the competition, as she was married and a mother. She began her life as a model and also participated as a model in several video clips and television commercials, then worked as a broadcaster on the Arab Radio and Television Network in 1999, and presented her first albums in 2001 and presented many albums and performed several concerts in many Arab countries. She entered the field of acting as a guest of honor in the movie Bahr Al Nojoum in 2008, and in 2009 she was chosen to star in the movie Dokan Shehata, which was directed by Khaled Youssef.

Life and career

Early life
Haifa Wehbe was born into a Lebanese Shia family on March 10, 1972, in Mahrouna, Tyre District, South Governorate, Lebanon to a Lebanese father, Muhammad Wehbe, and an Egyptian mother, Sayeda Abd al-Aziz Ibrahim. Haifa grew up in the capital, Beirut. She has three sisters and one brother. Wehbe claimed once that she was born in 1976, a date repeated by numerous sources. At one point, she mentioned that she is three years younger than her ex-husband Ahmed Abou Hashima, who was born in 1975. Her half-sister Rola Yamout posted a leaked document indicating that she was born in 1972. Wehbe won the title of Miss South Lebanon at the age of sixteen, and was a runner-up at the Miss Lebanon competition, but the title was withdrawn later from her after it was discovered that she violated the competitions law, as she was married and a mother.

Career

2004–2007: Baddi Aech and television career
Wehbe released her second studio album Baddi Aech (Arabic: بدي عيش, English: "I Want to Live") in early 2005, following the success of lead single "Ya Hayat Albi." Released after the assassination of Lebanese politician Rafik Hariri, the title single of the album is about "freedom, considered to be among the most basic of human rights". Follow-up single "Aana Haifa" (Arabic: أنا هيفاء, English: "I Am Haifa") became her biggest hit to date. In Summer 2005, she participated as a guest in Al Wadi, a local version of The Farm.

In 2006, she released the kids song "Bus al-Wawa" (Arabic: بوس الواوا, English: "Kiss the Booboo"), the song was later used in a Pepsi advertisement. It was also voted Song of the Year in 2006 by Radio Scope and Sawt Al Musika.

2008–2009: Film career beginnings and Habibi Aana
Wehbe starred in the Pepsi-produced film Sea of Stars released in early 2008, along with Carole Samaha, Ahmad el Sherif, Wael Kfoury, Brigitte Yaghi, and Ruwaida al-Mahrouqi.

On July 4, 2008, Wehbe released her third studio album Habibi Aana (Arabic: حبيبي أنا, English: "My Love") which contains 15 songs including the lead single "Moush Adra Estana".

2010–2012: Babe Haifa, and Malikat Jamal Al Kawn
Wehbe released a children's album Baby Haifa in March 2010 under Rotana Records. The song on the album "Baba Fein" became a big hit around the Muslim world, and is considered one of the most popular Arabic nursery rhymes, having 38 million views on YouTube.

In April 2010, Wehbe was featured on French DJ David Vendetta's album Vendetta on the song "Yama Layali".

In September 2011 Al Bawaba reported that Wehbe was threatening to leave her label Rotana "for neglecting her and not paying any attention to her work".

"Malikat Jamal Al Kawn" (MJK; English: "Miss Universe") was released on May 8, 2012 under Rotana Records, where she worked with Aphex Twin.

2013–present: Your Face Sounds Familiar, Breathing You In, and Mariam
During summer 2013, Webhe released her new song "Ghala Ghala".

In 2014, she signed with Tarik Freitekh's label and Wehbe shot her new song "Farhana" on June 21, 2014 in “Your Face Sounds Familiar” 2014 (Arabic translation: شكلك مش غريب).

In August 2014, she announced that she would be releasing a new song titled "Breathing You In" along with a video clip featuring Casper Smart.

In 2018, she starred in an Egyptian drama Lanaat Karma.

In September 2018, Haifa released her seventh studio album, Hawwa. The album features 15 songs, and debuted at No. 1 on iTunes charts. The album was produced independently by Wehbe herself, without a record label. In 2020, she accused her ex-business manager, Mohamed al-Waziry, of stealing $4m from her bank account, including also her fees from producers and party organizers.

In 2021, Haifa Wehbe released a new duet song entitled “Law Kont” with Egyptian artist Akram Hosni, and it exceeded millions of views in a few hours and remained number one on various charts across the Middle East. The music video was popular all over the world on YouTube.

Personal life
In the 1990s, Wehbe married her cousin Nasr Fayyad when she was 18 and traveled with him to Nigeria where he worked. During her pregnancy, she returned to Lebanon and separated from Fayyad, with whom she had one daughter, Zeinab.

On June 25, 2007, Wehbe survived an accident while filming a music video for the song "Hasa Ma Bena" in Lebanon. In the video, a single engine airplane was to chase Wehbe as she drove a car.  However, the airplane inadvertently hit the car, taking off the front windshield of the convertible she was driving. Despite the severity of the accident, Wehbe suffered only minor cuts and bruises.

Wehbe married Egyptian businessman Ahmed Abou Hashima on April 24, 2009 in Beirut. Among the guests at the wedding party were singer Anastacia, Carmen Electra, Sean Combs, Googoosh, Nawal Al Zoghbi, Najwa Karam, Ragheb Alama, and Sherine.

It was announced that Wehbe and Ahmed Abou Hashima had split in November 2012. Wehbe is a Shiite Muslim.

Wehbe has two granddaughters, Rahab and Daniella, born to her daughter Zeinab.

Criticism and Controversy

Wardrobe incident 
In November 2014, Wehbe caused controversy and was later heavily criticized, when she wore a revealing dress during a live episode of Arab Star Academy, where her bare butt was shown. She later apologized and blamed the stage lighting.

Allegations of Racism 
In 2009, the lyrics to Baba Fein arouse controversy with Nubians as in the lyrics its said "Where is my teddy bear and the Nubian monkey?" referring to Nubians as "monkeys". Nubians in Egypt accused her that her song aroused racism and discrimination. The lyric has since been removed of music platforms and instead replaced with "Where is my teddy bear" twice.

Political and social views
During the 2006 Israel–Lebanon War, she left her home, in Verdun, Beirut and moved to Egypt for the duration of the conflict. In a concert in the Lebanese town of Jounieh, Wehbe congratulated Hezbollah leader Hassan Nasrallah for his stand against Israel during the war.

Wehbe also refused to perform at any concert during the 34 days of the war, including fundraisers, saying that there were more ways than one to show support for Lebanon.

Another incident occurred after the 2009 Egypt–Algeria World Cup dispute, adding to the diplomatic tension between the two countries. Wehbe went on to make statements that she would not be performing in Algeria anytime soon, because Algerians "...wouldn't understand her music". Algeria's cultural minister responded by stating that Wehbe would be banned from performing in Algeria for insulting Algeria and the Algerian people regardless of whether she apologizes.

In January 2012, Wehbe tweeted that she loves all her fans including her "gay fan base". In June 2017, she replied to someone's criticism on Twitter by writing: "When a faggot speaks", which was later deleted. In 2018, she shared a photo on Snapchat with a rainbow flag, signaling her support for the LGBT community. In February 2019, Wehbe launched a fashion brand, Beau Voyou, which had rainbow colors, in which she commented, "For me, equality goes all the way", then added, "Get ready to celebrate unrestricted and boundless love".

Image 
Wehbe was ranked 8th in the 2006 Edition of the Top 99 Most Desirable Women by the website AskMen.com.

Some in the more conservative Arab countries deem her revealing outfits as scandalous. One Bahraini member of parliament called her a sexual singer who spoke with her body, not her voice. Wehbe said she was aware of the efforts to ban her from performing at the concert but had chosen to ignore their attempts to silence her.

In November 2014, Wehbe caused controversy and was later heavily criticized, when she wore a revealing dress during a live episode of Arab Star Academy. She later apologized and blamed the stage lighting.

In April 2008, the Islamic-dominated parliament of Bahrain passed a motion urging the government to ban Haifa Wehbe's show in the country. As a result of the motion, Wehbe performed in Bahrain with more modest dress, wearing a long green gown with a low V-neckline during the performance.

Discography

Studio albums
 Houwa Al Zaman (2002)
 Baddi Aech (2005)
 Farashet El Wadi (2006)
 Habibi Ana (2008)
 Baby Haifa (2010)
 Malikat Jamal Al Kawn (2012)
 Hawwa (2018)

Singles and music videos
{| class="wikitable" style="font-size: 95%;"
! Year !! Title !! Music Video Director !! Production
|- 
| 2002 ||Agoul Ahwak||Selim Al-Turk||Rotana
|- 
| 2002 ||Wahdi||Sameh Abdel Aziz||Dream TV
|-
| 2003 || Elhakni||Leila Bazzi & Fouad Suleiman||Beirut Marathon Association
|-
| 2003 ||Ma Sar||Sameh Abdel Aziz||Rotana
|-
| 2004 ||Ya Hayat Qalbi||Selim Al-Turk||Rotana
|- 
| 2005 ||Baddi Aech||Said Al-Marouk||Rotana
|- 	
| 2005 ||La Ma Khilset||Toni Kahwaji||LBCI	
|-	
| 2005 ||Teji Ezzai||Hadi Al-Bajuri||Mazzika
|-	
| 2005 ||Ragab||Hadi Al-Bajuri||Mazzika	
|- 	
| 2005 ||Aana Haifa||Hadi Al-Bajuri||Melody TV	
|- 	
| 2006 ||Bus al-Wawa||Emile Slailati||Melody
|- 	
| 2007 ||Moush Adra Estana||Yahia Saadeh||Mazzika
|-
| 2008 ||Matloch Li Had||Leila Kaanan||Mazzika
|-
| 2008 ||Hassa Mabina Haga||Yahia Saadeh||Mazzika
|-
| 2008 ||Sanara||Ahmad Al-Mahdi||Pepsi
|-
| 2009 ||Baba Fin & Lama Al-Shams Trouah||Leila Kaanan||Rotana
|-
| 2010 ||80 Million Ehsas||Mohammed Sami||Melody
|-
| 2010 ||Enta Tani||Mohammed Sami||Melody
|-
| 2010 ||Yama Lyali||Yahia Saadeh||Melody
|-
| 2011 ||Bokra Bfarjik||Gianni Magnoni||Rotana
|-
| 2012 ||Malikat Jamal Al Kawn||||Rotana
|-
| 2013 ||Ezzay Ansak||Angy Jammal||Rotana
|-
| 2014 ||Breathing You In||Tarik Freitekh||VEVO
|-
| 2018 ||Tota||Selim Al-Turk||Herself
|}

Filmography
Films
 Sea of Stars (2008)
 Dokkan Shehata (2011)
 Halawet Rouh (2014)
 Khair and Baraka (2017)
 Renegades of Europe (2020)

TV Series
 Kalam Ala Warak (2014)
 Mawlid wa Sahibuh Ghayb (2015)
 Maryam (2015)
 Al Herbaya (2017)
 Lanaat Karma'' (2018)

References

Further reading
 Arab youth revel in pop revolution by Sebastian Usher, May 21, 2007, BBC
 Head of Egypt's censorship board resigns after dispute over showing bombshell's steamy film. Associated Press

1972 births
Living people
21st-century Lebanese women singers
Rotana Records artists
Lebanese female models
Lebanese people of Egyptian descent
Lebanese Shia Muslims
People from South Lebanon
Lebanese pop singers
English-language singers from Lebanon
Naturalized citizens of Egypt
Singers who perform in Egyptian Arabic